This is a complete list of National Basketball Association players who have blocked 10 or more shots in a game.

44 players have blocked 10 or more shots in a game. It has occurred 160 times (including the playoffs) in NBA history. Mark Eaton accomplished the feat more times than anyone else in league history (19), followed by Manute Bol (18). Eaton, Hakeem Olajuwon, and Andrew Bynum are the only players to block 10 or more shots in a playoff game, with Bynum being the only player to do so with a victory.

The NBA did not record blocked shots until the 1973–74 season.

See also
NBA regular season records
List of NCAA Division I men's basketball players with 13 or more blocks in a game

References

Sporting News, The (2005).  2005–06 Official NBA Guide.

Blocks